Amanda Nomqhutsu Faku (born May 28, 1993) is a South African singer, performer and songwriter. Born and raised in the township of eZinyoka, Port Elizabeth. Faku rose to fame as a contestant on The Voice SA  season 2 in 2017 and prior getting recognition in the music industry. 

After she signed a record deal with The Vth Season, Ami released her debut studio album Imali (2019), debuted number one in South Africa.

Life and career

Early childhood 
At the age of 6, Faku had developed a strong passion  for music. She started singing at a house church which her father pastored and is influenced by the church, reggae, and hip hop. She later started recording music in early 2012 where her producer only lived a few blocks away from her house.

Career beginnings (2017-2019) 
In 2017, she competed in the TV talent show, The Voice SA, which was her major breakthrough in the music industry. Though she did not win, she was signed by The Vth Season record label.

2019-present:Imali, EA Wave Reimagines 
Following her success on The Voice SA, she launched her debut single titled "Ndikhethe Wena". Faku later worked with De Mogul SA on the song "Ungowam".
On January 31, 2020, single "uWrongo" by South African DJ Prince Kaybee was released features Ami Faku, Shimza and Black Motion. The song  was certified gold certification  on Recording Industry of South Africa with sales of 25 000 units.

Faku collaborated with South African DJ and producer Sun-El Musician on a song titled "Into Ingawe", certified 3× platinum by Recording Industry of South Africa (RiSA). In August 16, her single "Inde Lendlela" was released. The song later was certified platinum. On September 26, 2020, she released a single "Imali" featuring Blaq Diamond. The song was certified  platinum by the Recording industry of South Africa.

On September 27, 2020, her debut studio album Imali was released. The  album later was certified gold. It was produced by  Blaq Diamond, Sun-El Musician, 37MPH Eternal Africa and Wilson. In November 2020, she was  nominated for Best Female Southern Africa and Best Newcomer at African Muzik Magazine Awards.

In 2020, she was named as the most streamed female  artist in South Africa  by Deezer.

In August 21, she released her EP titled EA Wave Reimagines.
On October 31, 2020, her single with Wichi 1080 "Never Let you go" was released.

2021-present: new projects 
In January 22, she released a single "Lala Ngoxolo" featuring South African rapper Emtee.

In September 2021, Ami was featured on  "Abalele" by Kabza de Small and DJ Maphorisa. The song debuted number 4 on Spotify Charts.

In early October 2021, she was featured with Zimbabwean born singer Sha Sha on Nomfundo Moh single "Phakade Lami". That same month, Ami made collaboration on African Lullabies Part 1 compilation album by Platoon.

Following month she made collaboration with Kabza de Small and DJ Maphorisa on a single "Asibe Happy" released in November 2021.

Discography

Studio albums

Imali (2019)
TBA (2023)

EP's
 EA Wave Reimagines (2020)

Awards and nominations

References

External links
 

1993 births
Living people
South African musicians
Xhosa people
People from Port Elizabeth
Nelson Mandela University alumni